The 1917 Oglethorpe Stormy Petrels football team represented Oglethorpe University in the sport of American football during the 1917 college football season. In October 1917, Coach Frank B. Anderson held a meeting at Oglethorpe concerning the possibility of football team. Approximately 70 boys were enrolled at the newly re-founded Oglethorpe—20 of which were ready to begin Oglethorpe's inaugural season.

Schedule

References

Oglethorpe
Oglethorpe Stormy Petrels football seasons
Oglethorpe Stormy Petrels football